Caladenia parva is a plant in the orchid family Orchidaceae and is endemic to south-eastern Australia. It is a ground orchid with a single leaf and one or two green flowers with red stripes along the sepals and petals.

Description
The labellum is greenish with a white central region a dark red tip which curls under. Flowering occurs in September and October.

Taxonomy and naming
Caladenia parva was first formally described in 1991 by Geoffrey Carr from a specimen collected in the Dergholm State Park. The description was published in Indigenous Flora and Fauna Association Miscellaneous Paper 1. The specific epithet (parva) is a Latin word meaning "little".

Distribution and habitat
The small spider orchid occurs in scattered locations across southern Victoria and the far south-eastern corner of South Australia where it grows woodland and coastal scrub.

Conservation
Caladenia parva  is not listed under the Victorian Flora and Fauna Guarantee Act 1988.

References 

parva
Plants described in 1991
Endemic orchids of Australia
Orchids of South Australia
Orchids of Victoria (Australia)